.zm is the Internet country code top-level domain (ccTLD) for Zambia. Registrants of .zm domains must "have a presence in Zambia".

Second-level domains

Registrants are required to register domains at the third level under an existing second-level domain (SLD). There are eleven second-level domains:

 ac.zm: Academic institutions
 biz.zm: Businesses
 co.zm: Commercial entities
 com.zm: Commercial entities
 edu.zm: Academic institutions
 gov.zm: Government
 info.zm: "Information"
 mil.zm: Zambian military
 net.zm: Networks
 org.zm: Non-commercial organizations
 sch.zm: Schools

The designations above are assumed based on observed practices and standard conventions, as ZICTA (the ccTLD registry) do not maintain online documentation codifying this. Most entities will generally register either a .co.zm or .org.zm domain, if they choose to use the ccTLD rather than a generic top-level domain.

The one documented exception to the requirement to register at the third level is that "registered ISPs" may register at the second level—e.g., zamnet.zm. However, there are several undocumented variances to this rule—e.g., the Bank of Zambia's domain is boz.zm, and the regulator (ZICTA) operates under zicta.zm.

Registrars

ISPs are required to be registered with ZICTA, and only registered ISPs may be accredited as registrars. ZICTA lists ISPs on their website.

References

External links
 ZICTA Registry
 IANA .zm whois information

Country code top-level domains
Communications in Zambia
Internet properties established in 1994
Internet in Zambia

sv:Toppdomän#Z